Jackrabbit Slim is the second album by singer-songwriter Steve Forbert. It includes his biggest hit single, "Romeo's Tune", which peaked at No. 11 on the Billboard singles chart. The album rose to No. 20 on the Billboard albums chart. First pressings included a bonus one-sided 7-inch single of "The Oil Song."

Track listing
All songs written by Steve Forbert.
"Romeo's Tune" – 3:28
"The Sweet Love That You Give (Sure Goes a Long, Long Way)" – 3:35
"I'm in Love with You" – 4:47
"Say Goodbye to Little Jo" – 3:52
"Wait" – 5:31
"Make It All So Real" – 5:54
"Baby" – 4:12
"Complications" – 3:41
"Sadly Sorta Like a Soap Opera" – 3:40
"January 23–30, 1978" – 4:37

Charts

Personnel
Steve Forbert – lead vocals, guitar, harmonica
Bobby Ogdin – piano
Paul Errico – organ, accordion
John Goin – lead guitar
Alan Freedman – guitar (8)
Roger Clark – drums
Gunnar Gelotte – drums (5, 6, 7)
Bob Wray – bass (1, 3 ,4 ,8)
Jack Williams – bass (5, 7, 10)
Jerry Bridges – bass (2, 9)
Mike Leech – bass (6)
Bill Jones – saxophone
Ron Keller – trumpet
Dennis Good – trombone
The Shoals Sisters (Ava Aldridge, Cindy Richardson, Marie Tomlinson) – backing vocals

Production
Producer – John Simon
Engineer – Gene Eichelberger
Assistant Engineers – Willie Pevear, James Stroud, Connie Potter
Recorded at Quadraphonic Sound, Nashville
Mastered by George Marino
Design – Paula Scher
Photography – Benno Friedman

References

Albums produced by John Simon (record producer)
1979 albums
Steve Forbert albums
Columbia Records albums